Monkey Planet or variation, may refer to:

 Monkey Planet (novel), a sci-fi novel by Pierre F. Boulle, also released as Planet of the Apes
 Monkey Planet (TV series), 2014 UK BBC TV series
 Monkeys' Planet, Japanese manga comic book adaptation of "Planet of the Apes"; see Planet of the Apes (comics)
 "Monkey Planet" (TV episode), 2015 U.S. animated TV episode of All Hail King Julien

See also

 Monkey World, primate sanctuary and rescue center
 Earth (planet), the cradle of humanity

 Planet of the Apes (disambiguation)
 Monkey (disambiguation)
 Planet (disambiguation)